KBTU-LD (channel 23) is a low power television station in Salt Lake City, Utah, United States, owned by Innovate Corp. The station's transmitter is located atop Kesler Peak. KBTU-LD is available over the air and on local cable but not on any of the satellite services.

History
The original construction permit was applied by Airwaves Broadcasting LLC in Park City, Utah, in 2002. 

Bustos Media used to own the station; until March 2009, when it slashed nearly all of its longform local programming in response to the Great Recession, it had several local programs, including a morning show,  (Waking Up Utah), that had been on the air since 2006, as well as daily local newscasts that were canceled when the main anchor went on maternity leave.

In September 2010, Bustos transferred most of its licenses to Adelante Media Group as part of a settlement with its lenders. The change from Bustos to Adelante resulted in the launch of Mega TV on the channel, which had been airing music videos, as well as plans to relaunch local news. 

Adelante sold KBTU-LP, along with WBWT-LP in Milwaukee, Wisconsin, to DTV America Corporation for $425,000 on July 16, 2015.

On December 31, 2022, Azteca América ceased operations.

Subchannels
The station's digital signal is multiplexed:

KBTU-LD first applied for a construction permit on RF channel 23 in August 2000, which was amended several times, and granted in 2004. The station moved to RF channel 15 in 2021.

References

BTU-LD
Television channels and stations established in 2003
2003 establishments in Utah
Bounce TV affiliates
Innovate Corp.
Low-power television stations in the United States